Eyjafjörður (Island Fjord) is one of the longest fjords in Iceland. It is located in the central north of the country. Situated by the fjord is the country's fourth most populous municipality, Akureyri.

Physical geography
The fjord is long and narrow and measures 60 km from its head to its mouth. Its greatest width is 15 km between Ólafsfjörður and Gjögurtá at the fjord's mouth, but for the greater part of its length it is mostly 5–10 km wide.

The fjord is surrounded by hills and mountains on both sides; the mountains are taller on the west side, in the mountain range of the Tröllaskagi peninsula. In the outer part of the fjord there are no lowlands along the coast as the steep hills roll directly into the sea. Further south in the fjord there are strips of lowland along both coasts; these are wider on the west side.

Several valleys lead from Eyjafjörður: most of them to the west, where the two most significant are Hörgárdalur and Svarfaðardalur. Dalsmynni is the only valley on the east side. However the largest valley in the area is Eyjafjarðardalur, which runs directly south from the fjord itself. It is about 50 km long, and is home to one of Iceland's largest agricultural regions.

Several rivers flow into Eyjafjörður: the most significant are Eyjafjarðará and Hörgá (whose valleys are named above), and Fnjóská (which flows into the fjord via Dalsmynni).

The island of Hrísey in the middle of Eyjafjörður is the second largest island off the coast of Iceland and often referred to as "The Pearl of Eyjafjörður".

Eyjafjörður contains a number of hydrothermal vents in shallow (20 to 65 metres) water, with cones rising up to 20 metres below the water surface.

Settlements

The largest town by far is Akureyri; other settlements in the region are: Dalvík (the only other settlement with over 1000 inhabitants), Ólafsfjörður, Hrísey, Árskógssandur, Hauganes, Hjalteyri, Hrafnagil, Svalbarðseyri and Grenivík. Most of these settlements base their livelihood on fisheries and agriculture, but Akureyri is also a service center and the site of a growing university.

See also
 Fjords of Iceland

References

External links 

Fjords of Iceland
North Iceland
Counties of Iceland